Auraha is a village development committee in Parsa District in the Narayani Zone of southern Nepal. At the time of the 2011 Nepal census, it had a population of 5,392 people living in 809 individual households.

References

Populated places in Parsa District